Lake Hartwell State Park, formerly known as Lake Hartwell State Recreation Area, is a park located in Oconee County, South Carolina, near the community of Fair Play. The park was created in 1976, the majority on land leased from the United States Army Corps of Engineers with a small portion of land purchased from various private owners.

The  park has 14 miles of shoreline on Lake Hartwell. Two boat ramps provide boaters access to the lake. While the park focuses on fishing and boating, it also has a playground, areas for picnicking, hiking trails and sites for camping. Two cabins are also available for rental throughout the year. An information center features a display of vintage fishing equipment.

External links
Official website
Oconee Country

References

State parks of South Carolina
Protected areas of Oconee County, South Carolina